The Biggest Loser (Season 2) is the show's second season. Marion Caunter replaces Sarimah Ibrahim as the host of the show. This season officially started airing on September 21, 2010 on Diva Universal (Asia).

Contestants

Weigh Ins

The weights are measured in Kilograms.

Winners
 $100,000 Winner (among the finalists)
 $10,000 Winner (among the lose big finalists)
 Winner of the highest percentage of weight lost (among the eliminated contestants)
Teams
 Member of Kristy's team
 Member of Dave's team
Game
 Week's Biggest Loser
 Immunity (Challenge or Weigh In)
 Week's Biggest Loser & Immunity (Challenge)
 Last person eliminated before the finale
Notes
Manjit was originally on Kristy's Red Team but in Week 5, she switched to Dave's Blue Team
Leonardo was the biggest loser in Week 10, because of the 3 kg advantage that he received from the temptation the night before.
1. Shiela was a competitor on the lose big program alongside Rico and Desiree.

Weight Loss History

Notes
Bold means that he/she was the biggest loser of the week (by percentage).

1. During Week 10, Leonardo was the biggest loser because he won the temptation the night before the weigh in which gave him a 3 kg advantage making his weight loss total 5 kg.

Weight loss percentage history

Eliminating Voting History

 Immunity
 Below yellow line, unable to vote
 Not in elimination, unable to vote
 Vote not revealed
 Eliminated
 Last person eliminated before finale
 Valid vote cast

Notes
1. During Week 1, Marion told the contestants that the two people with the lowest percentage of weight loss on the losing team would automatically be eliminated. The first competitive weigh in saw the Red Team win and Rico and Desiree from the Blue Team were sent home and there was no voting.

2. During Week 2, The Red Team reached a hung vote between Manjit and Patty, and according to the Biggest Loser Rules, the Blue team had the power to vote anyone out; which in this case was Scott.

Episode Summaries

Episode 1: Expect the Unexpected

This season begins with the auditions being held all over Asia, starting with Manila city, then Singapore, followed by Jakarta, Kuala Lumpur and finally Bangkok. Tons of hopefuls turned up with the hope that their lives might change for the better. Some memorable moments included Malaysia's Nasha Lee, who weighed in at almost 250 kg. Even the first and current Asia's Biggest Loser's (David Gurnani) father walked through the doors and auditioned for TBLA. Judging the auditions were Dave Nuku and Kristy Curtis; David Gurnani replaced Dave Nuku for the auditions in Jakarta.

After an arduous search, 16 people were eventually chosen out of the thousands who auditioned, including Thailand's Patty Soon (one of the heaviest competitors ever). The 16 contestants were then sent to Putrajaya's luxurious IOI resort, where they were greeted by this season's host, Marion Caunter. Upon arrival, the contestants, already exhausted by the walk to the resort, were forced to do a challenge on the spot. The fastest male and female to win the challenge will become the captains of their respective teams (at that point, the teams had not been selected yet ). In the end, Singapore's Raj and Fish edged out everyone else, with Leonardo coming close with Raj. After the challenge, the contestants were then sent to the place they will be living in for the next few weeks. Upon arrival, the contestants were amazed by the grandeur of the mansion. After everyone had picked their rooms, Raj and Fish decided upon which trainer they wanted. Raj made it shown to Fish that he wanted Kristy to train him, but allows Fish to pick Kristy instead. In truth, Raj had already picked Dave to be his trainer.

Then, the captains and the other contestants went outside. The captains revealed their choices: Raj picked the Blue Team while Fish selected the Red. Then they began picking their teammates. In the end, Leonardo, Rico, Yana, Desiree, Shakira, Jonathan and Peachy were chosen by Raj and Lori, Patty, Genghis, Scott, Manjit, Saw and Nai were chosen by Fish. The teams then settled into their mansion when the trainers, Dave and Kristy showed up and summoned them.

The teams proceeded to the gym or as Rico described it as " a torture chamber". Marion then showed up and brought the contestants to the weighing room and started weighing them. The weights were a shock to many, but more importantly, a wake up call to everyone. Red Team's total weight was 1171 kg and the Blue Team's weight totaled up to 1130 kg. Marion then announced that by the end of the week, two contestants will be going home.

Training began in the Biggest Loser Asia, with both teams seemingly having their fair share of hard workers and slackers. Kristy describes Genghis to be ' a female princess' being that he constantly complains. During the training, Yana from the Blue team had a breakdown while on the spin bike, and Red Team's Saw collapsed on the treadmill and was flung of it. Nonetheless, he got back up and started walking again on the treadmill in what Kristy described as ' a Saw-like manner'.  Later, the teams were shown to be back in the mansion where Dave and Kristy introduced them an integral tool in weight loss and stressed the importance of good eating habits and to know the amount of calories in your favorite foods. Genghis was caught with surprise when he saw the details of a cheeseburger. “Whoa, a cheeseburger has 308 calories, and that’s just a cheeseburger, and I have ten of those."“You have to walk an hour just for that one cheeseburger that you ate. I don’t think it’s worth it.” Genghis added.

At the weigh in, the blue team results were relatively poor compared to last season: Raj, Jon and Leo lost 7 kg each, Shakira, Yana and Peachy lost 6 kg each, while Desiree and Rico lost 4 and 5 kg respectively. The Blue team was surprised by Desiree's low weight loss(-4 kg) but not by Rico's(-5 kg), saying that "Rico complains a lot in the gym and doesn't give it everything". The Red Team beat the Blue's total weight loss of 48 kg by a landslide. Fish, Manjit, Lori and Patty each lost 7 kg, Genghis lost 10 kg, Nai and Saw lost 8 kg each while Scott lost 15 kg, making him the biggest loser of the week, totalling the Red teams weight loss to 69 kg. As a twist, the winning team was decided by percentage loss. The Blue team's loss of 4.31% just was not enough to beat the Red team's loss of 5.89%. As a result, the 2 people from the Blue team with the lowest percentage of weight were eliminated. Desiree and Rico fell under the sword, both expressing disappointment with being the first to go home but were proud of their achievements here on The Biggest Loser Asia.

Episode 2: Only the Strong Will Survive?

The Blue team is still reeling from losing the weigh in and two of their members. Later, the 2 teams gathered in the dining room to congratulate the week's biggest loser, Scott. Lori takes the lead in preparing dinner for both teams since she has considerable culinary experience. Everyone, especially those from the Blue Team enjoys the meal, because the Blue Team having no experienced chef on their side, has been going through what Peachy describes as a 'food hell'. At the same time, Scott now realizes that with his amazing results, he has a target on his back.

Upon the trainers arrival, Dave Nuku tries to keep his team motivated and to get to the bottom of their team's poor performance; meanwhile, Kristy is ecstatic about the Red Team's victory, but also slightly disgruntled at the fact that her Red team shared a meal with the Blue Team. Training increases in intensity this week, especially within the Blue Team since they are desperate to turn things around. In this season's first challenge, the teams go head to head in a sailing competition. The first team to successfully finish one lap will be awarded massages and the ability to pick 2 people from the Red Team to sit out the weigh-in. Throughout the entire challenge, it was a close match, with both teams even smashing their boats into each other. In the end, the Blue team took the challenge, narrowly edging out the Red Team. Nai is particularly upset because the Blue team celebrated their victory in an ' in your face ' manner.

Prior to the weigh in, the Red team is shown to have a secret training session with the main focus on Saw. Scott and Genghis both have gut feelings about being sat out for the weigh in, thus they are going to use Saw as their 'secret' weapon. The Blue team also works out on their own by jogging from the gym back to the mansion. In sheer excitement, Peachy started sprinting and unfortunately injures herself in the process. At the weigh in, Raj chooses to sit Genghis and Scott out for the weigh in. They lose much less compared to last week, 1 kg and 3 kg respectively; this makes Raj question his choice. The rest of the Red team did not do very well either: Fish, Manjit and Lori each lose only 2 kilos, Patty and Saw lose 3 kilos each and Nai loses 4 kilos. Within the Blue team, Peachy and Leo loses 2 kg each, Yana loses 3 kg, Jonathan and Shakira lose 4 kg each and captain Raj loses 5 kg.
Red team's percentage of weight loss of 2.12% was not good enough to beat the Blue team's percentage of weight loss of 2.54%. Shakira is the biggest loser of the week and Nai is the biggest loser on the Red Team, meaning he has immunity.

Later, the Red team is shown deliberating on who to eliminate; Manjit and Patty seem to be the most obvious targets. Blue Team captain, Raj uses this opportunity to infiltrate the Red Team. He makes deals with the supposedly 'weaker' members of the Red team, convincing them to vote off their stronger players. Lori comments 'Scott, Nai and I are aware that some of our members are colluding with the Blue Team and unfortunately I don't know if they're just very gullible or very naive because Raj has a very Machiavellian mind. He's playing them, but they don't know that they're being played.”

In the elimination room, the Red Team reached a tie between Manjit and Patty. Therefore, Raj decided to send the strongest player home, Scott. Although visibly upset, he is still proud of everything he has accomplished in just 2 short weeks.

Episode 3: The Aftermath

The episode starts off with Raj celebrating Scott's departure as it will weaken the Red Team significantly. This in turn angers the already crumbling Red Team. Genghis adds: ' When I saw Raj, with a smiling face,I swear I just want to punch him'. Next morning, Kristy starts screaming in anger at her Red Team for letting the Blue Team have the vote. She also describe how mad she was at Raj for infiltrating her Team. At that moment, Lori and Genghis fueled the firestorm by going at an all out argument over team loyalty. After the yelling was over, all the Red Team members vow to fight harder and Lori & Genghis promise to keep their cool. The Blues celebrated their victory with Dave Nuku by playing a prank: when Dave walks into the gym, Raj hid himself and made Dave think that he was eliminated, while the rest of the Blue Team sits by the stairs looking dismayed. Then, just when Dave is consoling his 'broken' team, Raj pops up out of the Blue and the news breaks out to Dave that his Blue Team won the weigh in. In the Red Team, training intensity climbs higher as everyone needs to make up for Scott's departure. Everyone is shown struggling, especially Genghis, who at one point stomps on the treadmill and falls off it.

This week's challenge requires both teams to move a hundred sand bags (weighing at about 5 kg each) across a distance and build a platform. The first team to properly arrange the bags and have all of its members ON the platform wins. Both teams had their strategies, but in the end the Blue Team won with their superior strategy. The men in the Red team, were so upset to the point that they refused to shake hands with the victors. The Blue team won a trip to a cruise boat, where they indulge a fair bit. Raj mentions ' We're still keeping our calorie count'.

At the weigh in, within the blue team, Jonathan and Leo lose 4 kg each, while Raj and Yana lose 2 kg only, Shakira loses 3 kilograms and finally, Peachy loses only one kilo. Then the Red Team steps on the scale, Fish loses 2 kilos, but it will not count since Raj for some reason picked her to sit out the weigh in. Then, Saw loses 4 kg but is still not happy with it, Patty and Lori each lose 3 kg, while Genghis delivers a disappointing 2 kg. In the end, it boils down to Nai, and he loses a whopping 6 kilos. The Reds win the weigh in and the Blue team was sent to the elimination.

At the elimination, the Blue team decided to boot out Yana over Peachy, because they believe Peachy is a very hard worker. Yana then says her goodbyes and reflects on how far she has come since day one in The Biggest Loser.

Episode 10: Luck of Draw

Following Jonathan's exit from the competition, Raj and Leo are feeling outnumbered by the former Red Team members. After finishing in 5th at the past weigh-in, just one spot above the dreaded yellow line, Raj is extremely worried.  He knows that former Red Team members despise him, and will not hesitate to get rid of him, should he ever fall below the yellow line.

As the contestants arrive at the challenge location, Marion informs them that this week's challenge has been specially designed by world-renowned bootcamp fitness expert Chief Brabon, founder of ORIGINAL BOOTCAMP™, for The Biggest Loser Asia. The military style obstacle requires the contestants to run 3 laps around the pond, picking up a 3 different objects along the way. Each lap measures 1.2 kilometres in distance with an additional staircase obstacle. The 1st lap of the race requires each person to strap on a field bag, weighing 20 kilos for the men and 15 kilos for the ladies. At the start of the 2nd lap, everyone will have to pick up a 5 kilo mock rifle. And to top things off, for the 3rd and final lap, the contestants will have to carry 2 jerry cans filled with water. The first person to complete the race wins immunity and a 1-year supply for Nestle Fitnesse Cereal. With a look of sheer determination on his face, Nai powers through and is the first person to cross the finish line. This is the 2nd immunity challenge in a row that Nai has won. Fish finishes in 2nd place, followed by Leo, Raj, Lori and Genghis.

Upon arriving at Tuscany Restaurant, Marion informs the contestants that a temptation challenge is about to take place. Everyone will have the opportunity to earn a special advantage at tomorrow's weigh-in, but only if they feel that the benefits outweigh the cost. The person, who eats the most pizza in ten minutes, will get to pick a card from the wooden container. The numbers on the cards range from 0–3 kg. No one has a made a move for the pizza. With less than 2 minutes remaining, Leo looks over and sees Lori signalling to Genghis to eat. He quickly starts stuffing 2 slices of pizza into his mouth. He then win the challenge, Leo sticks his hand into the wooden container and comes out with the 3 kg card. It looks like the pizza was worth every bite. Leo will get a 3 kg weight advantage at tomorrow's weigh-in.

At the weigh-in, Nai is the first person to step onto the scale. This is the 2nd week in a row that he has won immunity from the challenge. The room becomes silent as +3 kg pops up on the screen. Nai has just gained 3 kg (weight loss percentage +3.00%). Nai is the first person to gain kilos during the season
Lori is next to weigh-in and is disappointed to see that she has only lost 2 kg, for weight loss percentage of -2.15%. Genghis takes his turn on the stage and drops 3 kg, for a weight-loss percentage of -2.42%. He now occupies top spot on the leader board.

It is now turn for Leo to weigh-in. He only loses 2 kg this week for a weight loss percentage of -1.89%. However, because he won the temptation challenge the night before, and chose 3 kg  out of the container, it will be added on to his result. Leo's weight-loss increases to 5 kg, which changes percentage weight loss to -4.72% and moves him up the top of the leader board. Raj looks nervous as he waits patiently on the scale for his weight-loss to appear. He breathes a huge sigh of relief as he sees 3 kg pop up on the screen, his weight-loss percentage stands at -2.73% which puts him 2nd in the weekly ranking.

Fish is the last person to weigh-in. A look of disbelief appears on her face as she realizes that she has only lost 1 kg this week. “It’s my worst fear come true. And to see that 1kg there, it’s like a slap in the face after all the hard work I’ve put in,” comments a devastated Fish. Her weight-loss percentage for the week is -1.45%, the lowest result of the day. Fish is now below the yellow line with Nai. However, because Nai has immunity, he moves up above the yellow line, pushing Lori beneath it. Therefore, Lori and Fish are both nominated for elimination tonight.

Lori and Fish are the last 2 remaining women left in the competition and one of them will be going home tonight. Genghis is the first person to reveal his vote. Due to their turbulent relationship, it is no surprise to anyone that he has written Lori's name down.

Raj is next and he votes for Fish, because he considers her to be a big threat. Nai then casts his vote for Lori. There are 2 votes for Lori and 1 vote for Fish. Leo is the last person to cast his vote. Marion informs him, that if he votes for Lori, then she will be going home. But if he decides to vote for Fish, then there will a tie. This means that the person with the lowest percentage weight-loss at this week's weigh-in eliminated, and that is Fish. 
As Leo prepares to reveal his vote, he says “Both ladies sitting below the yellow line are capable of doing things that I even in all these weeks still can’t seem to do. There’s no lack of effort from either of them. Over and over again it’s just a game, so with that being said, my vote is for Solid Gold Fish.” The tie vote means that, the journey for Fish has come to an end.

References

External links
 Official site
 the biggest loser season 2 contestants by budiey.com

Asia (Season 2)
2010 Malaysian television seasons